The Top Ten Professional Women Awards are presented every October by the Marjaree Mason Center of Fresno, California.

The awards ceremony attracts more than 800 people a year, and for more than 25 years, the event has served as the primary fundraiser for Marjaree Mason Center domestic violence services.

Nominations for the awards are accepted from the community at large, and a committee of volunteers
select the award winners based on strides in their professions, service to their communities, and how
they have served as positive role models.

Since 2005, a Top Business Award has also been selected and presented at the event.  The winner of this award is selected based on strides in its field, its support of women employees, and its support of women in the community.

See also

 List of awards honoring women

References

External links
Marjaree Mason Center Official Website
ABC 30 feature on Top Ten Winners
Med Watch Feature on winner
Fresno State feature on winner
Marjaree Mason Center Spanish Wikipedia Page

Charity events in the United States
Ceremonies in the United States
Awards honoring women